The American Idols Live! Tour 2011 is a summer concert tour in the United States, Canada and the Philippines that features the Top 11 contestants of the 10th season of American Idol. The 49-date tour started in West Valley City, Utah, on July 6, and its North American leg ended in Rochester, New York on September 10. Forty-five dates were originally planned but four extra dates were added due to high demand, including two final shows in Manila, Philippines, only the second time the show has traveled outside North America after Singapore was added to the tour schedule in Season 3.

This season's tour was promoted again by AEG Live after a year with Live Nation. This year Ford Motor Company, Coca-Cola, and U.S. Air Force Reserve joined as sponsors of the tour.

Performers

Show overview
In a break from the previous three years where the shows were essentially a series of mini-concerts by individual performers, this year there were more ensemble performances. Also unlike the previous three years, the individual performers did not perform according to their elimination order on American Idol, and the number of songs performed by each performer did not reflect their elimination order.

The show started with a group performance by the girls and the first half ended with a group performance. The first half featured solos from the first six eliminated contestants—Pia Toscano, Paul McDonald, Thia Megia, Stefano Langone, Naima Adedapo and Casey Abrams, while the Top 5 performed their solos in the second half. Duets and group performances interspersed the solo performances. The second half started with solos by the runner-up Lauren Alaina, and ended with solos by the winner Scotty McCreery followed by the traditional closing group performances.

Setlist

Naima Adedapo, Thia Megia, Haley Reinhart, Lauren Alaina and Pia Toscano – "Born This Way" (Lady Gaga)
Toscano – "Empire State of Mind" (Jay-Z and Alicia Keys)
Toscano and Stefano Langone – "California King Bed" (Rihanna)
Paul McDonald – "Maggie May" (Rod Stewart)
Megia – "Who Says" (Selena Gomez & the Scene)
Megia, Reinhart, Adedapo and Toscano – "Tightrope" (Janelle Monáe)
Langone – "Grenade" (Bruno Mars)
Langone (Adedapo, Megia, Reinhart and Toscano on backing vocals) – "DJ Got Us Fallin' in Love" (Usher)
McDonald, James Durbin, Casey Abrams, Langone and Jacob Lusk – "Animal" (Neon Trees)
Adedapo – "On the Floor" (Jennifer Lopez)
Toscano – "This Time" (Pia Toscano)
Alaina, Toscano and Megia – "Firework" (Katy Perry)
Abrams – "Smooth" (Rob Thomas and Santana)
Abrams and Reinhart – "Moanin'"
Abrams – "Harder to Breathe" (Maroon 5)
All (Except Scotty McCreery) – "Forget You!" (Cee Lo Green)
Intermission
Alaina – "Flat on the Floor" (Katrina Elam) and "Like My Mother Does" (Kristy Lee Cook)
Alaina (Langone, Megia and Reinhart on backing vocals) – "If I Die Young" (The Band Perry)
Durbin – "Sweet Child o' Mine" (Guns N' Roses) and "Uprising" (Muse)
Lusk – "Never Too Much" (Luther Vandross)
Lusk (Adedapo, Langone and Toscano backing vocals) – "You're All I Need to Get By" (Marvin Gaye and Tammi Terrell)
Reinhart – "The House of the Rising Sun" (Traditional) and "Bennie and the Jets" (Elton John)
McCreery – "Your Man" (Josh Turner), "Are You Gonna Kiss Me Or Not" (Thompson Square) and "I Love You This Big" (Scotty McCreery)
McCreery and Alaina – "When You Say Nothing at All" (Keith Whitley)
McCreery (Alaina, Megia, Reinhart and Toscano on backing vocals) – "Gone" (Montgomery Gentry) 
Group medley – Durbin and Alaina – "Here I Go Again" (Whitesnake), Abrams, McDonald and Reinhart – "Faithfully" (Journey), Adedapo, Langone, Lusk and Megia – "Walk This Way" (Aerosmith), all – "Any Way You Want It/Lovin', Touchin', Squeezin'" (Journey)

Additional notes
 Lauren Alaina sprained her ankle backstage at the Portland show, and performed her next show with the injured foot strapped in a boot.
 The performance of Firework was removed from the setlist in shows starting from Rosemont, Illinois due to Lauren Alaina needing to rest her voice. However, it did return to the set starting with the Philadelphia show. Alaina did not appear in the first half in Columbus and Pittsburgh, but did appear in the second. However, she missed the Baltimore show completely, and reported that she was suffering from severe bronchitis.
 Paul McDonald was absent from the Providence show.
 The show at Albany on August 28, 2011, was postponed to September 4, 2011, due to Hurricane Irene that struck the East Coast of the United States on August 27.
 It was the second time that the American Idol Live! Tour traveled to Asia with the Philippines being the second and only country for this year that they traveled to outside the United States and Canada.

Tour dates 

 The Albany show was originally scheduled for August 28 but moved to September 4, 2011, due to Hurricane Irene.

Response
The tour attendance rebounded after the poor turn-out for the Season 9 tour. Sixteen of the first 24 shows were sold out, and more than 97% its tickets hasd been sold through its first 14 dates with an average venue size of 8,100. The tour grossed $22,002,464 from 47 shows (the two Philippines shows did not report) with an attendance of 97%. The tour had the highest number of sell-outs of all seasons due in part to a lower-average venue size of 8,856. It was ranked number 38 in the Pollstar Top 200 North American Tours for 2011.

Revenue
The tour was ranked No. 38 in the list of 2011 Year-end Top 200 North American tours, based on total gross income.

Tour summary
Number of shows – 49 (24 sold out)
Total gross – $22,002,464 (47 shows)
Total attendance – 403,695
Average attendance – 8,589 (97.0%)
Average ticket price – $54.5
Highest gross – Raleigh, North Carolina – $696,605
Lowest gross – Syracuse, New York – $286,435
Highest attendance – Raleigh, North Carolina – 13,533 (100%)
Lowest attendance – Syracuse, New York – 4,975 (89.1%)

References

American Idol concert tours
2011 concert tours